The Oklahoma Indigent Defense System is the system in Oklahoma that provides trial, appellate, and post-conviction criminal defense services to persons judicially determined to be entitled to legal counsel at expense to the state. The Oklahoma Indigent Defense System was created by and is responsible for implementing the Oklahoma Indigent Defense Act.

Indigent Defense Act of Oklahoma http://www.ok.gov/OIDS/documents/Indigent%20Defense%20Act.pdf

Board of directors
The system is governed by the Oklahoma Indigent Defense System Board. The Board is composed of five members appointed by the Governor of Oklahoma for staggered five-year terms with the advice and consent of the Oklahoma Senate. At least three members of the Board be licensed attorneys with criminal defense experience. The Governor designates one member as the Chair of the Board. No congressional district or county may be represented by more than one member on the Board.

Current Board members
 Rod Wiemer - Chair
Term ending: July 1, 2013
Don G. Pope
term ending: July 1, 2012
Dennis N. Shook
Term ending:  July 1, 2011
Jake Jones, III - Vice Chair
Term ending: July 1, 2010
Randolph S. Meacham
Term ending: June 30, 2014

Organization
Board of Directors
Executive Director
General Operations Program
Executive Division
Trial Program
Non-Capital Trial Division
Capital Trial Division (Norman)
Capital Trial Division (Tulsa)
Appellate Program
General Appeals Division
Capital Direct Appeals Division
Capital Post-Conviction Division

External links
Oklahoma Indigent Defense System website

State law enforcement agencies of Oklahoma